The Temple of Human Passions, also known as the Horta-Lambeaux Pavilion, is a neoclassical pavilion in the form of a Greek temple that was built by Victor Horta in 1896 in the Parc du Cinquantenaire/Jubelpark of Brussels, Belgium. Although classical in appearance, the building shows the first steps of the young Victor Horta towards Art Nouveau. It was designed to serve as a permanent showcase for a large marble relief The Human Passions by Jef Lambeaux. Since its completion, the building has remained almost permanently closed. Since 2014, the building is accessible during the summer time.

History

Inception and construction
In 1889, Victor Horta was commissioned for 100,000 Belgian francs to design a pavilion to house Jef Lambeaux's sculpture The Human Passions on the recommendation of his teacher Alphonse Balat, King Leopold II's favourite architect.

The small temple of classic look already announced the Art Nouveau manner associated with the architect. Although loyal to the formal vocabulary of classical architecture, Horta already managed to incorporate all elements of the new style. At first sight, the building looks like a classic temple. However, there is not a single straight line in the building. Every classic detail is revisited and reinterpreted. Horta succeeded in designing an almost "organic" interpretation of the classical temple, without completely abolishing any reference to an historical style. Slightly bent like the foot of a tree, the walls seem to have sprung organically. After World War I, Horta would return to this classicism in his designs for the Centre for Fine Arts and the Musée des Beaux-Arts in Tournai.

The building, though, has had a turbulent history. The small neoclassical pavilion was originally planned for the 1897 Brussels International Exposition, of which it is one of the few physical remnants. Although completed in time for the fair, the collaboration between the architect and the artist soon led to an irreconcilable disagreement delaying its official opening until 1899. At first, Horta designed the pavilion's facade to be open, serving as a shelter on rainy days — without the wall and bronze doors behind the colonnade — so that the relief would always be visible for passers-by. But Lambeaux, against the will of Horta, wanted a gallery wall behind the columns. The dispute remain unsolved for years: on the day of the inauguration on 1 October 1899, the unfinished temple stood open with the relief visible from the surrounding park. Under pressure of the public opinion and the authorities, Horta had to alter his plans and close the temple with a wooden barricade, and it was left unfinished only three days after inauguration.

Lambeaux never knew the temple as it currently stands. Shortly after Lambeaux's death, Horta acceded to his wishes by building the wall that would permanently hide the bas-relief with a closed front to enhance the natural light coming through the glass roof.

Later years
In 1967, the building was given in leasehold for 99 years by King Baudouin to King Faisal ibn Abd al-Aziz of Saudi Arabia, on an official visit to Belgium, together with the East Pavilion of the 1880 National Exhibition that would later become the Great Mosque of Brussels, to house a museum of Islamic art. The building and the relief were protected by a royal decree on 18 November 1976. Two years later, the donation to King Khaled of Saudi Arabia was made official by the royal decree of 12 September 1979.

The government of Saudi Arabia eventually gave its operation back to the Royal Museums of Art and History. The pavilion remained closed to the public except on occasional open days. Since 2002, the temple is open one hour per day, except on Mondays. In recent years, this was not due to the prudishness of the public, but out of fear for vandalism.

Renovation
The building was left unattended for more than a century, and by the early 21st century, it required urgent renovation works. In 2008, the Belgian government officially started the process of contracting out the renovation works by publishing two government procurements in the Moniteur Belge. The restoration of the work of Jef Lambeaux should follow.

Renovation works of the building began in May 2013 and were completed in 2014 for a total cost of €800,000 financed by Beliris. The renovation of the relief itself was finished in 2015.

The Human Passions relief 
The Horta pavilion houses the monumental achievement of the sculptor Jef Lambeaux (1852–1908): The Human Passions relief. The draft on paper was presented at the Triennial Salon of Ghent in 1889, creating immediately a big commotion. The journal L'Art Moderne in 1890 described the work as:
(…) a pile of naked and contorted bodies, muscled wrestlers in delirium, an absolute and incomparable childish concept. It is at once chaotic and vague, bloated and pretentious, pompous and empty. (…) And what if, instead of paying for 300,000 francs of  "passions", the government simply bought works of art?

Commissioned in 1890 by King Leopold II for 136,000 francs, the  work was centered around the theme of the happiness and the sins of mankind dominated by death. It also depicted the "negative" passions of mankind such as war, rape and suicide.

The relief had been very controversial ever since the presentation of the project in 1886. Although enthusiastic at the beginning, art critics especially regret the lack of cohesion of the work. Despite the controversy, the Belgian State acquired the work in 1890 for installation in the Cinquantenaire. Werner Adriaenssens is also inclined to deny the work mythical status: 
Sure it’s large, as Lambeaux intended, but hardly a masterpiece. The relief consists of separate groups rather than forming a whole. Unfortunately Lambeaux never explained his intentions. Even the title isn’t his.

On 1 October 1899, Horta's temple was officially inaugurated and the work revealed to the public. The unveiled way in which Lambeaux depicted the male and female nude was highly debated in the press. The relief depicting uninhibited nudes in any manner of carnal delights caused scandal. Nudity was not the only problem: the representation of the crucified Christ below Death outraged conservative Belgium. The open building was concealed from public view with a wooden barricade only three days after its first public presentation. Finally the government responded to the criticisms by asking Horta to close the front of the building with durable materials in 1906. The front wall came in 1909. The building finally reopened in 1910, without official opening, and remains unfinished.

The Belgian state ordered a plaster copy of Lambeaux's relief for its display in several World's fairs. The copy is today on display at the Fine Arts Museum of Ghent, Belgium. A fragment of the work won in 1900 a medal of honour at the World fair of Paris.

Notes

References
Citations

Bibliography

Further reading

External links

 

Cinquantenaire
Art Nouveau architecture in Brussels
Neoclassical architecture in Belgium
Pavilions
Victor Horta buildings
Jef Lambeaux
Cultural infrastructure completed in 1896
World's fair architecture in Belgium